Maqluba or Maqlooba is a traditional Iraqi, Lebanese, Palestinian, Jordanian, and Syrian dish served throughout the Levant. It consists of meat, rice, and fried vegetables placed in a pot which is flipped upside down when served, hence the name maqluba,  which translates literally as "upside-down." The dish goes back centuries and is found in the Kitab al-Tabikh, a collection of 13th century recipes.

Ingredients 
Maqluba can include a variety of vegetables, such as fried tomatoes, potatoes, cauliflower, and eggplant, accompanied by either chicken or lamb. The most common are cauliflower and eggplant. All the ingredients are carefully placed in the pot in layers, so that when the  pot is inverted for serving, the dish looks like a layer cake. 

Maqluba is typically garnished with pine nuts and chopped fresh parsley. It sometimes served with salad and fresh yogurt, and is often prepared for feasts and large gatherings.

Since the unsuccessful coup attempt in Turkey, in 2016, the dish is seen as a "Gulenist delicacy". It is assessed as strong evidence of membership of the Gülen movement.

See also 

 Arab cuisine
 Egyptian cuisine
 Israeli cuisine
 Jordanian cuisine
 List of casserole dishes
 Macaroni Hamin
 Palestinian cuisine

References

External links 

 Maqluba (Upside-Down Chicken and Rice)

Arab cuisine
Jordanian cuisine
Palestinian cuisine
Iraqi cuisine
Levantine cuisine
Lebanese cuisine
Mediterranean cuisine
Israeli cuisine
Syrian cuisine
Rice dishes